Jeffry is a given name. Notable people with the name include:
Jeffry D. Wert, American historian and author specializing in the American Civil War
Jeffry H. Larson, American Professor of Marriage and Family Therapy at Brigham Young University
Jeffry McWild, character from the video game Virtua Fighter
Jeffry House (born 1946), American lawyer in Toronto, Ontario, Canada
Jeffry Picower (1942–2009), American investor and philanthropist involved in the Madoff investment scandal
Jeffry Wyatville (1766–1840), English architect and garden designer

See also 

 Jeffery (name)
 Jeff
 Geoffrey (name)